Dave Miller may refer to:
 Dave Miller (baseball) (born 1966), American baseball player and coach
 Dave Miller (footballer, born 1921) (1921–1989), English footballer
 Dave Miller (footballer, born 1964), English footballer
 Dave Miller (New Zealand musician), New Zealand-born musician, leader of Australian band, Dave Miller Set
 Dave Miller (producer) (1925–1985), American popular-music record producer
 Dave Miller (broadcaster), American broadcaster
 Dave Miller (singer-songwriter) (born 1952), American singer-songwriter
 Dave Miller (cyclist) (born 1960), English track and road cyclist
 Dave Miller (fl. 2000s), American musician, co-founder of rock band Senses Fail
 Dave Miller, a fictional character in the TV series Waterloo Road (TV series)

See also
 David Miller (disambiguation)